Laura Munana (born July 24, 1981, in San Jose, California, United States) is an American-born former ice dancer who represented Mexico in international competition with her brother Luke Munana. The two competed for the United States until 2004. After that, they competed at the Four Continents Championships and the World Figure Skating Championships for Mexico, as well as competing on the Grand Prix circuit. The Munanas were the first ice dancers to compete internationally for Mexico. They retired from skating after the 2006–2007 season.

Results
Ice Dance (with Munana)

(with Paul Goldner)

References

External links
 

American female ice dancers
Mexican ice dancers
1981 births
Living people
Figure skaters from San Jose, California
21st-century American dancers
21st-century Mexican dancers
21st-century American women